In the New Zealand Parliament, the leader of the Legislative Council was a government minister appointed by the prime minister to be responsible for the management of government business in the Legislative Council until its abolition.

The office was created to delegate authority for a member of the Legislative Council (MLC) to introduce government legislation on behalf of the prime minister (who was normally a member of the House of Representatives instead).

List of holders
The following individuals held the office of leader of the Legislative Council.

Key

See also
New Zealand Legislative Council
Leader of the House (equivalent in the House of Representatives)

Notes

References

Lists of political office-holders in New Zealand